20 Minuten is a free daily newspaper in Switzerland.

History and profile
20 Minuten was first published in 1999 by 20 Minuten Schweiz AG. The direct competitor metropol was available in Switzerland between 2000 and 2002. 20 Minuten is published in  tabloid format.

Since 2005 the newspaper has been owned by Express-Zeitung AG, which is jointly owned by Tamedia (majority holding) and Berner Zeitung (17.5%).

In the German-speaking parts of Switzerland, specific editions are made for the regions of Basel, Bern, Lucerne, St. Gallen and Zurich.

Circulation
20 Minuten is distributed to commuters at over 150 train stations across the country.  Since September 2004 the German-language edition has been the most widely read daily newspaper in Switzerland, surpassing Blick. The audited distribution in 2004 was 329,242 (WEMF AG) and it had a readership of an estimated 782,000. In 2010 its circulation was 494,368 copies, making it the most read daily paper in the country.

See also
 List of free daily newspapers
 List of newspapers in Switzerland

References

External links 

  (in German)
 20 Minuten (in German), profile of the newspaper on the website of Tamedia

1999 establishments in Switzerland
Publications established in 1999
Free daily newspapers
German-language newspapers published in Switzerland
Mass media in Lucerne